Pseudochromis wilsoni, the yellowfin dottyback, is a species of ray-finned fish from around Australia, which is a member of the family Pseudochromidae.

Entymology
The fish is named for Leonard Wilson of Darwin, Australia, who collected animals for the Australian Museum (Sydney), including fishes.

References

wilsoni
Taxa named by Gilbert Percy Whitley
Fish described in 1929